Edward Charles James Gardner, DFM (24 August 1924 – 3 May 2010) was an English actor.

During World War II, Gardner served in the Royal Air Force as an air gunner with No. 10 Squadron. He completed 30 sorties as a Halifax rear gunner and was awarded the Distinguished Flying Medal.

His first film appearance was in The Curse of the Mummy's Tomb released during 1964. Thereafter he appeared in over 30 films and also made extensive TV and theatre appearances. Some of his best known Shakespearean roles such as Adam in As You Like It, and Gravedigger in Hamlet were performed under the direction of Terry Hands.

He played Knight Bus driver Ernie Prang in Harry Potter and the Prisoner of Azkaban, the third film in the Harry Potter film series.

Filmography

 Doctor Who : Marco Polo (1964) .... Chenchu
 The Curse of the Mummy's Tomb (1964) .... Fred's Mate
 He Who Rides a Tiger (1965) ....  Waiter
 The Murder Game (1965) .... Arthur Gillett
 Arabesque (1966) .... Hemsley (uncredited)
 The Committee (1968) .... Boss
 Take a Girl Like You (1970) .... Voter
 Say Hello to Yesterday (1971) .... Balloon Seller (uncredited)
 10 Rillington Place (1971) .... Mr Lynch
 Up the Chastity Belt (1971) .... Little Man
 Frenzy (1972) .... Hotel Porter
 Ooh... You Are Awful (1972) .... Waterloo Porter (uncredited)
 Take Me High (1973) .... Hulbert
 11 Harrowhouse (1974) .... Man in Snack Bar (uncredited)
 Percy's Progress (1974) .... Clerk of Court (uncredited)
 Slade in Flame (1975) .... Charlie's Dad
 Short Ends (1976) .... Alchemist
 Doctor Who : Underworld (1978) .... Idmon
 Tess (1979) .... Pedlar
 The Company of Wolves (1984) .... Ancient
 Mountains of the Moon (1990) .... Jarvis
 Robin Hood: Prince of Thieves (1991) .... Farmer
 Thin Ice (1995) .... Old Man with gun
 Gunslinger's Revenge (Italian title: Il mio West) (1998) .... Sam Comet
 Harry Potter and the Prisoner of Azkaban (2004) .... Ernie the Bus Driver
 Finding Neverland (2004) .... Mr. Snow
 Deuce Bigalow: European Gigolo (2005) .... Kaiser (final film role)

References

External links

1924 births
2010 deaths
People from Newmarket, Suffolk
English male film actors
English male television actors
20th-century English male actors
21st-century English male actors
Royal Air Force airmen
Royal Air Force personnel of World War II
Recipients of the Distinguished Flying Medal